Hikmet Balioğlu (born 4 August 1990) is a Turkish footballer who plays as a centre-back for BB Bodrumspor. He made his Süper Lig debut on 10 May 2008 against Beşiktaş.

References

Hikmet ve Thioune Şanlıurfaspor'da, haberturk.com, 9 January 2016

External links
 
 

1990 births
Living people
Sportspeople from Manisa
Turkish footballers
Turkey B international footballers
Turkey youth international footballers
Manisaspor footballers
Altınordu F.K. players
Gençlerbirliği S.K. footballers
Şanlıurfaspor footballers
Utaş Uşakspor footballers
Sarıyer S.K. footballers
Süper Lig players
TFF First League players
TFF Second League players
Association football central defenders
Association football defenders